Ronald Lee Powlus (born July 16, 1974) is a former American football quarterback and former quarterbacks coach for the University of Notre Dame Fighting Irish football team, Akron Zips football team and the Kansas Jayhawks football team.

High school career
Powlus was one of the most heavily touted prospects in the history of high school football as an offensive standout at Berwick High School.  Powlus was honored with several national prep player of the year awards, including Parade Magazine, Gatorade, and USA Today in 1992.

College career

After Powlus signed his letter of intent with Notre Dame in 1992, ESPN analyst Beano Cook famously predicted that Powlus would win the Heisman Trophy at least twice and that he would be the best quarterback in the history of Notre Dame. This was extremely high praise considering that only one player in the history of college football, Archie Griffin, had won the trophy twice.

Powlus was a two-time Irish captain for teams coached by Lou Holtz and Bob Davie who, before the ascent of Brady Quinn in 2005, held 20 school records. He started 42 of 44 regular-season games (Thomas Krug started in place of injured Ron Powlus during the end of the 1995 season plus the 1996 Orange bowl) in which he played for the Irish (plus two bowl games) and finished with 558 career completions on 969 attempts for 7,602 yards and 52 touchdowns. He set the Irish single-game mark for TD passes in a game with four (three times) and at one point completed 14 straight passes. He set single-season marks in 1997 as a senior with his 182 completions and 298 attempts.

Powlus rebounded from a broken collarbone suffered in the preseason of what would have been his freshman season in 1993 and then broke a bone in his upper left arm late in the 1995 season.

Powlus received his undergraduate degree from the Notre Dame College of Business Administration in 1997.

College statistics

Bowl games
1995 Fiesta Bowl - Colorado 41, Notre Dame 24
1996 Orange Bowl - Florida State 31, Notre Dame 26 (*Powlus did not play in this game after suffering a season-ending arm injury against Navy)
1997 Independence Bowl - LSU 27, Notre Dame 9

Professional career
Powlus was signed as an undrafted free agent in 1998 by the Tennessee Oilers of the National Football League but was released before the start of the season. In December 1998, he signed with the St. Louis Rams practice squad before being released. He was on the Detroit Lions' preseason roster in 1999.

In the spring of 2000, he played for the Amsterdam Admirals of NFL Europe during their 10-game season, splitting time with Jim Kubiak at the quarterback position. Powlus finished his pro football career as a backup quarterback on the roster of the 2000 Philadelphia Eagles (NFL) but did not throw a pass during the regular season.

Personal life
He spent two years as executive assistant to the Democratic Policy Committee of the Pennsylvania State Senate. He was later employed in the banking and pharmaceutical industries. His son, Ron Powlus III, has signed as a quarterback for Notre Dame in the 2021 season.

Coaching career
On March 1, 2005, Powlus returned to Notre Dame as the football team's director of personnel development under head coach Charlie Weis. Following the termination of Peter Vaas' contract, Powlus assumed Vaas' position as the team's quarterbacks coach.  After the 2009 season, Powlus was fired along with nearly the entire Notre Dame staff by head coach Brian Kelly. After his departure from Notre Dame he reunited with another former Notre Dame coach, Rob Ianello, as the quarterbacks coach at the University of Akron. After being hired as the head coach of Kansas, Charlie Weis named Powlus his quarterbacks coach.

References

External links
Just Sports Stats

1974 births
Living people
American football quarterbacks
Akron Zips football coaches
Amsterdam Admirals players
Detroit Lions players
Kansas Jayhawks football coaches
Notre Dame Fighting Irish football coaches
Notre Dame Fighting Irish football players
Philadelphia Eagles players
Tennessee Oilers players
People from Berwick, Pennsylvania
Players of American football from Pennsylvania